Moisés Castillo Mosquera (born 24 May 2001) is a Colombian professional footballer who plays as a centre-back for Marítimo.

Career
Mosquera signed his first professional contract with Marítimo on 14 August 2020. He began his senior career with their reserves, before being sidelined by an injury in April 2021. He made his professional debut with Marítimo in a 2-1 Primeira Liga win over Portimonense on 9 January 2022.

References

External links
 
 

2001 births
Living people
Footballers from Medellín
Colombian footballers
Association football defenders
C.S. Marítimo players
Primeira Liga players
Campeonato de Portugal (league) players
Colombian expatriate footballers
Colombian expatriates in Portugal
Expatriate footballers in Portugal